Verkh-Karaguzh (Üstügi Kara-Kuş) is a rural locality (a selo) in Mayminskoye Rural Settlement of Mayminsky District, the Altai Republic, Russia. The population was 481 as of 2016. There are 5 streets.

Geography 
Verkh-Karaguzh is located 17 km northeast of Mayma (the district's administrative centre) by road. Mayma is the nearest rural locality.

References 

Rural localities in Mayminsky District